"I'll Do as Much for You Someday" is a song written by Ed G. Nelson and Ed Nelson Jr.

Slim Whitman recorded it for RCA Victor on February 3, 1949. It was released as a single, as the flip side to "I'm Casting My Lasso Towards the Sky", in April of the same year.

Billboard gave a "satisfactory" review, writing: "Okay ballad number here, with performance less than adequate."

Track listing

Eddy Arnold version 
In 1962, Eddy Arnold released his rendition on a single (RCA Victor 7984, "I'll Do As Much For You Someday" / "Tears Broke Out on Me"), but it was the other side that became successful.

Track listing

References 

1949 songs
1949 singles
RCA Victor singles
1962 singles
Slim Whitman songs
Eddy Arnold songs
Songs with music by Edward G. Nelson